Zumalai is a city and subdistrict (former Mape-Zumalai) in East Timor. The subdistrict has been part of Cova Lima District since 2003. Before that, it was part of Ainaro District. The Zumalai subdistrict has six main villages: Fatuleto, Raimea, Zulo, Mape, Lour, and Taisilin.

Language 
There are three main local languages in Zumalai subdistrict, Bunak, Kemak, and Tetun-Terik.

References

Populated places in East Timor
Cova Lima Municipality